Philippe Chancerel (6 April 1925 – 15 August 2002) is a French sailor who competed in the 1948 Summer Olympics and in the 1956 Summer Olympics.

Chancerel was born in Paris on 6 April 1925. He died in Évecquemont on 15 August 2002, aged 77.

References

External links
 

1925 births
2002 deaths
French male sailors (sport)
Olympic sailors of France
Sailors at the 1948 Summer Olympics – Dragon
Sailors at the 1956 Summer Olympics – Star